Berryer is a surname. Notable people with the surname include:

Antoine Pierre Berryer (1790–1868), French advocate and parliamentary orator
Nicolas René Berryer (1703–1762), French magistrate and politician

See also
Berrier (surname)